Jakuarte is a monotypic snout moth genus described by Pierre Viette in 1953. Its single species, Jakuarte martinalis, described in the same article, is known from Madagascar.

References

Phycitinae
Monotypic moth genera
Moths of Madagascar